Main Directorate for Internal Affairs of Krasnodar Krai (ГУ МВД России по Краснодарскому краю) or the Police of Krasnodar Krai (Полиция Краснодарского края) is the main law enforcement agency in Government of Krasnodar Krai in Southern Russia.

The central Headquarters is in Krasnodar City, which held his own police force.

History
The Police in Krasnodar Krai was formed by governmental decree of Kuban Oblast Government on April 18, 1918, under the command of Yan Vasilevich Poluyan. On September 29, 1937 the police became part of local branch of the NKVD.

In 1947 the NKVD become MVD, and IN 1956 the police become part of the local government.

After the dissolution of the USSR, the police continue to operate under the supervision of MVD and local government and in 1996 the police become an executive law enforcement agency called "Main Directorate for Internal Affairs of Krasnodar Krai".

On 2011 many police officers has been fired out, as part from the police reforms.

Management
 Vladimir Vinevskiy, Commander of Krasnodar Krai Police, Since February 2011
 Yuri Kuznetsov, Deputy
 Sergei Gorbunov, Deputy, Head of Spetsnaz Services
 Nikolai Roui, Deputy, Head of Main Investigations Directorate
 Vasily Umnov, Deputy, Chief of Sochi Police
 Vyacheslav Bolgov, Deputy, Head of Homefront Department

See also

 Krasnodar City Police

External links
Official Homepage
Krasnodar City Police - Official Homepage
Novorossiysk City Police
State Traffic Police of Krasnodar Krai

Law enforcement agencies of Russia
Government agencies established in 1918
Krasnodar Krai